This article lists the main modern pentathlon events and their results for 2003.

International modern pentathlon events
 August 11 & 12: 2003 Pan American Games in  Santo Domingo
 Individual winners:  Vakhtang Iagorashvili (m) /  Anita Allen (f)
 December 6 & 7: 2003 Military World Games (CISM) in  Catania
 Individual winners:  Enrico dell Amore (m) /  Dong Le'an (f)

World modern pentathlon events
 July 14: 2003 World Modern Pentathlon Championships in  Pesaro
 Individual winners:  Eric Walther (m) /  Zsuzsanna Vörös (f)
 Men's Team Relay winners:  (Ákos Kállai, Gábor Balogh, & Viktor Horváth)
 Women's Team Relay winners:  (Bea Simoka, Zsuzsanna Vörös, & Csilla Füri)
 August 30: 2003 World Youth "A" Modern Pentathlon Championships in  León
 Youth Individual winners:  Pavel Sekretev (m) /  Aya Medany (f)
 Youth Men's Team Relay winners:  (Mena Tadros, Ahmed Samir, & Omar El Geziry)
 Youth Women's Team Relay winners:  (Ildiko Hidvegi, Nikola Stefanovits, & Katalin Prill)
 September 9: 2003 World Junior Modern Pentathlon Championships in  Athens
 Junior Individual winners:  Mihail Prokopenko (m) /  Heather Fell (f)
 Junior Men's Team Relay winners:  (Robert Liptak, Ádám Marosi, & Zoltan Halasi)
 Junior Women's Team Relay winner:  Vera Feshchenko

Continental modern pentathlon events
 Note: There seemed to be a discrepancy by the UIPM. Both Budapest and Ústí nad Labem claim to be the European MP host city.
 May 2: 2003 European Modern Pentathlon Championships in  Budapest
 Individual winners:  Petr Lébl (m) /  Aleksandra Sadovnikova (f)
 May 24 & 25: 2003 NORCECA (Pan American) Modern Pentathlon Championships in  Santo Domingo
 Individual winners:  Eli Bremer (m) /  Maribel Sanz-Agero (f)
 June 12: 2003 South American Modern Pentathlon Championships in  Santiago
 Winner:  Eduardo Carvalho
 June 12: 2003 European Junior Modern Pentathlon Championships in  Ústí nad Labem
 Junior Individual winners:  Mihail Prokopenko (m) /  Anastasiya Prokopenko (f)
 Junior Men's Team Relay winners:  (Yahor Lapo, Vitali Bavin, & Mihail Prokopenko)
 Junior Women's Team Relay winners:  (Evdokia Gretchichnikova, Vera Feshschenko, & Tatiana Gorliak)
 August 14: 2003 European Youth "B" Modern Pentathlon Championships in  Varna
 Youth Individual winners:  Igor Zenin (m) /  Laura Salminen (f)
 August 28: 2003 European Modern Pentathlon Championships in  Ústí nad Labem
 Individual winners:  Edvinas Krungolcas (m) /  Georgina Harland (f)
 Men's Team Relay winners:  (Viktor Horváth, Ákos Kállai, & Sandor Fulep)
 Women's Team Relay winners:  (Bea Simoka, Csilla Füri, & Zsuzsanna Vörös)

2003 Modern Pentathlon World Cup
 March 6: MPWC #1 in  Mexico City
 Individual winners:  Edvinas Krungolcas (m) /  Claudia Corsini (f)
 April 24: MPWC #2 for Women in  Székesfehérvár
 Individual winner:  Csilla Füri
 Women's Team Relay winners:  (Sian Lewis, Sarah Langridge, & Georgina Harland)
 April 25: MPWC #2 for Men in  Berlin
 Winner:  Andrea Valentini
 May 11: MPWC #3 for Men in  Budapest
 Winner:  Andrejus Zadneprovskis
 June 1: MPWC #3 for Women in  Warsaw
 Winner:  Paulina Boenisz
 June 26: MPWC #4 in  Most
 Individual winners:  Michal Sedlecky (m) /  Kim Raisner (f)
 December 13 & 14: MPWC #5 (final) in  Athens
 Individual winners:  Rustem Sabirkhuzin (m) /  Georgina Harland (f)

References

External links
 Union Internationale de Pentathlon Moderne Website (UIPM)

 
Modern pentathlon
2003 in sports